Tebenna silphiella, the rosinweed moth,  is a moth of the family Choreutidae. It is known from the central part of the United States, including Wisconsin, Illinois and Colorado. The habitat consists of prairies and meadows.

The forewings are brown in the basal third and in the terminal area. There is a prominent colored area in the distal third of the wing composed of small black, white, and brown bands. The subterminal line is white, curving basally before reaching the costa. The remainder of the wing is covered with whitish spots and several white scale patches. The hindwing is brownish-gray with a thick dark terminal line and a long dark fringe.

Adults are on wing from early to late May. There are two generations per year.

The larvae feed on Silphium integrifolium. They skeletonize the leaves of their host plant, almost always on the top leaves (those at or near the apex). Full-grown larvae are about 12 mm long. Larvae have been recorded from May to June.

References

External links
mothphotographersgroup
microleps.org

Tebenna
Moths described in 1881